Siləyli (also, Sileyli) is a village and municipality in the Zardab Rayon of Azerbaijan.  It has a population of 447.

References 

Populated places in Zardab District